Morrow High School is the easternmost secondary school in Clayton County, Georgia, United States. Part of Clayton County Public Schools; it is located in Ellenwood at 4930 Steele Road. The school's teams are known as the Mustangs.  Middle schools generally associated with Morrow High are Morrow Middle School, Adamson Middle School and Rex Mill Middle School.

Clayton State University is the nearest post-secondary school, though some college-bound students enroll at the University of Georgia, Georgia Southern University, University of West Georgia, Georgia Gwinnett College and Georgia State University.  Recent students have also attended Stanford University, Duke University, Yale University, Brown University, Embry-Riddle Aeronautical University, Massachusetts Institute of Technology, Georgia Institute of Technology, Savannah School of Art and Design, and Morehouse College.

A new $80 million campus is being built just east of the current location with a stadium and basketball arena. It will be the largest and most expensive school built in Clayton County.

Extracurricular activities
Future Business Leaders of America
Student Government Association
Anime Club
Beta Club
Color Guard
DECA
Drill Team
Eco-Club
French Club
Step Team
Latin Club
Latinx Student Union
Orchestra
Marching band
Mock Trial
Multicultural club (Diverse 4 Life)
National Honor Society
Student Council
Technology Student Association
Elite Scholar's Club
Spanish Club

Scholars

2010s 
In 2018 one student received the Horatio Alger State Scholarship, the Nancy Penn Lyons Scholarship, and attended Stanford University. In 2019, another student graduated and went on to attend Duke University. In 2022, another student graduated and went on to attend the University of Pennsylvania.

2000s 
Some recent Morrow High School students have received the Gates Millennium Scholarship (GMS) founded by the Bill & Melinda Gates Foundation. In 2006, two graduating seniors received it, one of whom went to Massachusetts Institute of Technology, and the other to Georgia State University. In 2007, three graduating seniors received the scholarship, and went on to Yale University, the University of Georgia, and Clayton State University, respectively. In 2008, two more students received the award, making it three years in a row that the school had students receive full funding for any college of their choice.

Notable alumni
 Bob the Drag Queen - winner of season 8 of Rupauls Drag Race; Class of ‘04
 Jeb Flesch - former professional football player
 Andre Hastings - former professional football player for the Pittsburgh Steelers and New Orleans Saints; Class of '90
 Karin Slaughter - crime writer; debuted with her novel Blindsighted
 Christia'n Chase Jarvis - President of the University of South Carolina Upstate. Creator of Chavís Clothing Co. Class of '19

References

External links
 Morrow High School
 Clayton County Public Schools#Loss of accreditation

Public high schools in Georgia (U.S. state)
Schools in Clayton County, Georgia
1969 establishments in Georgia (U.S. state)
Educational institutions established in 1969